Taal is a 1999 Indian Hindi language musical romantic drama film co written, edited, produced and directed by Subhash Ghai. The film stars Aishwarya Rai, Akshaye Khanna and Anil Kapoor in lead roles, while Amrish Puri and Alok Nath feature in supporting roles. It was also dubbed in Tamil as Thaalam. Taal was premiered at the Chicago International Film Festival, the "official selection" at the 2005 Ebertfest: Roger Ebert's Film Festival, and retrospectively at the 45th IFFI in the Celebrating Dance in Indian cinema section.

Taal released on 13 August 1999, coinciding with the Indian Independence Day weekend, and proved to be a major commercial success at the domestic and overseas box office, becoming the first Indian film to reach the Top 20 on Variety'''s box office list. The film received widespread critical acclaim upon release, with major praise directed towards the direction, story, screenplay, dialogues, soundtrack, costumes, choreography and performances of the cast.

At the 45th Filmfare Awards, Taal received 12 nominations, including Best Film, Best Director (Ghai) and Best Actress (Rai), and won 6 awards, including Best Supporting Actor (Kapoor), Best Music Director (Rahman) and Best Lyricist ( for "Ishq Bina").

 Synopsis 

Jagmohan Mehta arrives in Chamba, India for a long vacation with his rich and affluent family, including his son Manav. They meet Mansi, the beautiful daughter of poor spiritual singer Tara Shankar Manhuja. As the owner of the Mehta & Mehta Group of Companies, Jagmohan is looking to invest in Chamba with Manav. Over time, Jagmohan and Tara become friendly with each other.

Eventually, Mansi and Manav fall in love. Reluctant after knowing this, Jagmohan disapproves of Mansi due to her poor socio-economic background. After learning the same, Tara is earlier angry but later reaches Mumbai to visit his journalist cousin Prabha, and to meet the Mehtas. Unfortunately, the family insults Tara. Deeply hurt, he leaves with Mansi, who breaks up with Manav.

Mansi soon meets famous music producer and director Vikrant Kapoor, who happens to be Tara's fan. She signs a 3-year contract with him, and performs dance numbers and remixes of his productions and Tara's songs. She wins awards and becomes a sensation. Slowly, Vikrant begins falling for Mansi. Manav finds out his family was in the wrong when they ill-treated Mansi and Tara.

Manav goes to apologise to Mansi for what his family did. She rejects him out of grief for how Tara was treated. Vikrant learns of Mansi's past with Manav. Ignoring it, he proposes to her. She eventually accepts it. After winning an award in Canada, Mansi returns to India to prepare their marriage. Jagmohan and Tara patch things up after the former realises his mistake and apologises.

On the wedding day, Vikrant realises Mansi loves Manav. He assures her they can still be friends, and urges her to honour her love to Manav. Jagmohan and Tara also give their blessings; Manav and Mansi finally get married. The Mehtas take a family picture after the wedding, as the film ends...

 Cast 
 Aishwarya Rai Bachchan as Mansi Shankar Manhuja, Manav and Vikrant's love interest
 Akshaye Khanna as Manav Kumar Mehta, Mansi's love interest
 Anil Kapoor as Vikrant Kapoor, Mansi's love interest
 Amrish Puri as Jagmohan Mehta, Manav's father
 Alok Nath as Tara Shankar Manhuja / Tara Babu, Mansi's father
 Jividha Sharma as Ilavati "Ila" Shankar Manhuja, Mansi's cousin
 Sushma Seth as Nani, Manav's grandmother
 Mita Vashisht as Prabha Shankar Manhuja, Tara's cousin
 Saurabh Shukla as Surjoy Banerjee, Vikrant's assistant
 Prithvi Zutshi as Deepmohan Mehta, Jagmohan's brother
 Supriya Karnik as Shakuntala Deepmohan Mehta, Jagmohan's sister-in-law
 Manoj Pahwa as Santram Singh
 Rajesh Khera as Brijmohan Mehta
 Ekta Jain as Mansi's first cousin
 Puneet Vashisht as Shaukat
 Akash Karnataki as Siddu
 Bobby Darling as Dress Designer Narwendra Khanna
 Asha Bachani as Dolly Brijmohan Mehta
 Sunil Nagar as Police Commissioner
 Anita Hassanandani in the song "Ishq Bina"
 Shahid Kapoor as background dancer in song "Kahin Aag Lage"
 Isha Sharvani as background dancer in song "Kahin Aag Lage"
 Subhash Ghai as man with walkman at market (Cameo appearance)

 Music 

The soundtrack of the film was composed by A. R. Rahman with lyrics penned by Anand Bakshi. The soundtrack was released on 12 June 1999 and it become a major critical and commercial success. At a press conference, Ghai remarked, "I credit the name of the movie to composer A. R. Rahman. This movie is a romance and I could have called it any thing – Dil, Pyaar, Hum Bhaag Gaye, but it was Rahman's presence in the movie that gave me the confidence to call it Taal. Taal means music and music means Taal. The whole credit goes to A. R. Rahman and Anand Bakshi. Rahman kept me awake many nights, but after listening to the songs, I felt it was worth all the trouble."

The soundtrack became a tremendous success, and was sold more than 1.85million units within a month of its release. It went on to sell 4million units, becoming the best-selling soundtrack for a 1999 Hindi film. The soundtrack made the list of "Greatest Bollywood Soundtracks of All Time", as compiled by Planet Bollywood.

Track listing

ReceptionTaal was a critical and commercial success in India netting 22 crore in India on a budget of 11.50 crore, and also performed well internationally. In the United States, it became the first Indian film to reach the top 20 on Variety's box office list. The final worldwide gross collection of the film stands at 51.16 crore, making it the 4th highest grossing Bollywood film of 1999. Taal'' was screened at the Chicago International Film Festival and selected by Roger Ebert for his 2005 Overlooked Film Festival.

Accolades 
Anil Kapoor won many awards for his role as Vikrant Kapoor (the role went to him after Govinda declined it) including the Filmfare Award for Best Supporting Actor, the IIFA Award for Best Supporting Actor, the Zee Cine Award for Best Supporting Actor, and the Screen Award for Best Supporting Actor. Alka Yagnik won the Best Female Playback Singer for the song "Taal Se Taal Mila". Composer A. R. Rahman also received a number of awards for his work in the film, including the Filmfare Award for Best Music Director, the IIFA Award for Best Music Director, and the Zee Cine Award for Best Music Director. Aishwarya Rai was nominated for the Filmfare Award for Best Actress and the Screen Award for Best Actress.

References

External links
 
 Roger Ebert on Taal

1999 films
1990s Hindi-language films
1990s romantic musical films
1990s musical drama films
1990s dance films
Films directed by Subhash Ghai
Films set in Himachal Pradesh
Films shot in Himachal Pradesh
Indian romantic musical films
Indian musical drama films
Indian dance films
Films set in Canada
Films scored by A. R. Rahman
Films with screenplays by Sachin Bhowmick
Hindi films remade in other languages
1999 drama films